The Vilayet of Syria, also known as Vilayet of Damascus, was a first-level administrative division (vilayet) of the Ottoman Empire.

The accuracy of the population figures ranges from "approximate" to "merely conjectural" depending on the region from which they were gathered.

History
In 1864, the Vilayet Law was promulgated. The new provincial law was implemented in Damascus in 1865, and the reformed province was named Suriyya/Suriye, reflecting a growing historical consciousness among the local intellectuals. Jerusalem was separated from the rest of the province, and made into an independent sanjak of Jerusalem that reported directly to Istanbul, rather than Damascus. Mount Lebanon had been similarly made into a self-governing mutesarrifate in 1864.

In 1872, a new administrative region was created, with its center in Ma'an, but the costs for the new administrative unit far outweighed the revenues, and it was closed the following year. In 1884, the governor of Damascus made a proposal to establish a new vilayet of southern Syria, though nothing came out of this.

In 1888, a vilayet of Beirut was formed from the vilayet of Syria. In May 1892, another proposal was made for a regional government centered in Ma'an, which was approved in August. In mid-1895, the centre of this mutasarrifiyya was moved to Karak (Mutasarrifate of Karak), marking the southernmost extent of Ottoman rule in the vilayet of Syria.

As of 1897, the Vilayet Syria was divided into four sanjaks: Damascus, Hama, Hauran and Karak. The Vilayet's capital was Damascus.

See also
 Ottoman Syria
 Administrative divisions of the Ottoman Empire

References

External links
 

Vilayets of the Ottoman Empire in Asia
1865 establishments in the Ottoman Empire
1918 disestablishments in the Ottoman Empire